El Frasno is a municipality in the province of Zaragoza, Aragon, Spain. According to the 2004 census (INE), the municipality had a population of 476 inhabitants.

This town is located in the Sierra de Vicort range close to the Carretera Nacional N-II highway. The Puerto del Frasno mountain pass is named after it.
According to the 2010 census the town had a population of 141 inhabitants.

Villages
El Frasno
Aluenda, located further to the SW by the highway as well.
Inogés
Pietas

See also
Comunidad de Calatayud
List of municipalities in Zaragoza

References

External links

Bienvenidos a El Frasno
Frasno (El) - CAI Tourism of Aragon

Municipalities in the Province of Zaragoza